Manchester Monarchs may refer to:

Manchester Monarchs (AHL) (2001–2015)
Manchester Monarchs (ECHL) (2015–2019)